The Light of Western Stars is a 1940 American Western film directed by Lesley Selander, starring Victor Jory as Gene Stewart, and based upon a novel by Zane Grey. The film is also known as Border Renegade (American alternative title).  The supporting cast features Jo Ann Sayers, Russell Hayden, Morris Ankrum, Noah Beery Jr. as Jory's character's Mexican sidekick, Tom Tyler and Alan Ladd (two years out from superstardom in a supporting role as a ranch hand named "Danny"; his part in this film is much larger than his billing would indicate).

That same year, another Zane Grey novel titled Knights of the Range was produced at the same studio with the same screenwriter, director, and much the same cast, albeit without Beery or Ladd.

Cast 
Victor Jory as Gene Stewart
Jo Ann Sayers as Madeline "Majesty" Hammond
Russell Hayden as Alfred "Al" Hammond
Morris Ankrum as Nat Hayworth
Noah Beery, Jr. as Poco – Stewart's Sidekick
J. Farrell MacDonald as Bill Stillwell – Rancher
Ruth Rogers as Florence "Flo" Kingsley – Al's Girl
Tom Tyler as Sheriff Tom Hawes
Rad Robinson as Monty – Stilwell Ranch Hand
Eddie Dean as Nels, Stillwell Hand
Esther Estrella as Bonita – Adobe Saloon Girl
Alan Ladd as Danny – Stillwell Ranch Hand
Georgia Ellis as Helen – Majesty's Boston Pal
Earl Askam as Sneed – Hawes' Deputy
Lucio Villegas as Justice of the Peace Don Manuel

External links 

1940 films
1940s romance films
1940 Western (genre) films
Films based on works by Zane Grey
American Western (genre) films
American black-and-white films
1940s English-language films
Films scored by Victor Young
Films based on American novels
Films based on Western (genre) novels
Paramount Pictures films
American romance films
Films directed by Lesley Selander
1940s American films